Beki Boxer is a Filipino comedy-drama series created  by TV5 and released on March 31, 2014. It stars Alwyn Uytingco, Vin Abrenica, Joross Gamboa and Claire Ruiz. It is considered as the 2nd gay-themed drama series on the primetime block after the success of My Husband's Lover. It premiered on the network's primetime block, replacing Let's Ask Pilipinas.

Cast
Alwyn Uytingco as Rocky "The Tsunami" Ponciano
Vin Abrenica as Renato "Atong" Villaflor/Marlon Villafor
Danita Paner as Chloe
Joross Gamboa as Madonna
Claire Ruiz as Venus
Christian Vasquez as Max
Candy Pangilinan as Consuelo
Cholo Barretto as Elorde
Kristel Moreno as Jessa
Onyok Velasco as Onyok
John Regala as Dalmacio
Alizon Andres as Gardo
Jerald Napoles as Toto

Guest stars
Aubrey Miles as Yvette
Albie Casiño as Eric Ibañez
Ryan Yllana as Beber
Tina Monasterio as Clarissa
Rain Prince Allan Quite as Young Rocky
Elijah Maguindayao as Young Elorde
Nonong "Bangkay" de Andres as Adonis
Bekimon as Leyla
Brent Manzano as James
Ram De Leon as Sushmita
Bing Uytinco Jr. as Barang
Alvin Anson as Antonio
Denver Cuello as Marvin "The Hammerhead" Ortega
Michael Farenas as Leonardo “Matador” Gonzales
Juan Martin Elorde as Mike "Pitbull" Traje
Edgar Gabejan as Bobby "The Silent Assassin" Delgado
Aldred Gatchalian as Charles
Buboy Fernandez as himself
Dennis Laurente as Gordon Berdugo
Luke Jickain as Dyanggo
Danton Remoto as himself
Rex Tso as Zhang "The Chameleon" Shin
Isabelle de Leon as Isabelle Raymundo of Trenderas
Katrina Velarde as Diva Salambangon of Trenderas
Lara Maigue as Lara San Miguel of Trenderas
Aaron Hewson as himself
Ed Picson as himself

Rocky's Professional Fight Results
vs. Marvin "The Hammerhead" Ortega - Won via decision.
vs. Leonardo "Matador" Gonzales - Won via knockout.
vs. Mike "Pitbull" Traje - Won via disqualification.
vs. Bobby "The Silent Assassin" Delgado - Lose via knockout.
vs. Gordon Berdugo - Won via disqualification.
vs. Renato "Atong" Villaflor - Won via decision.
vs. Zhang "The Chameleon" Shin - Won via knockout.

Awards and nominations

References

External links
Official website

Philippine drama television series
2014 Philippine television series debuts
2014 Philippine television series endings
TV5 (Philippine TV network) drama series
Philippine LGBT-related television shows
Philippine sports television series
Filipino-language television shows
2010s LGBT-related comedy television series
2010s LGBT-related drama television series